The Thurmond House is a historic house at 407 Britt in Siloam Springs, Arkansas.  It is an American Foursquare wood-frame house,  stories in height with a wide hip roof.  It is finished in novelty siding, with distinctive corner boards topped by capitals.  A single-story porch, with a concrete base and piers, extends across the width of the front facade.  The second level has a small central window flanked by trios of narrow one-over-one sash; there is a hip-roof dormer in the roof.  Built c. 1910, the house is typical of many Foursquare houses built around that time, but is set apart by its porch and corner boards.

The house was listed on the National Register of Historic Places in 1988.

See also
National Register of Historic Places listings in Benton County, Arkansas

References

Houses on the National Register of Historic Places in Arkansas
Houses completed in 1910
Houses in Siloam Springs, Arkansas
National Register of Historic Places in Benton County, Arkansas